The 2005–06 EHF Women's Cup Winners' Cup was the thirtieth edition of EHF's competition for women's handball national cup champions. It ran from October 1, 2005 to May 20, 2006.

1985 champion Budućnost Podgorica, now representing Serbia and Montenegro, won its third European trophy and the first one since the break-up of Yugoslavia, beating Győri ETO, which defeated defending champion Larvik HK in the semifinals. It was Győri ETO's fourth lost European final in five years.

Results
First preliminary round. October 1–9, 2005

References

Women's EHF Cup Winners' Cup
2005 in handball
2006 in handball